Leutfridus was a French monk and saint of the eighth century.

Life
Leutfridus studied at Condat Abbey and at Chartres, and was for a time a teacher at Evreux.  A Benedictine, he was also a spiritual student of Saint Sidonius of Saint-Saëns.  He spent time as a hermit at Cailly and at Rouen. He founded the abbey of La Croix-Saint-Qu'en around 690, and served as its first abbot.  The abbey was later renamed Saint-Leufroy in his honor.

Leutfridus died in 738; his feast day is June 21.

Leutfridus was the brother of Saint Agofredus.

Butler's account

The hagiographer Alban Butler wrote,

References

External links

St Leutfridus, Saint of Just and Holy Wrath, excerpt from a lecture given by Prof Plinio Corrêa de Oliveira on June 20, 1967

738 deaths
French Benedictines
8th-century Frankish saints
Year of birth unknown